Osaze Tafari De Rosario (born July 19, 2001) is an American professional soccer player who plays for Canadian Premier League side York United.

Early life
De Rosario was born in San Jose, California, where his father, Canadian national team player Dwayne De Rosario, was playing for the San Jose Earthquakes.

De Rosario is a product of the Toronto FC and New York City FC academies. In 2018, he played with Toronto FC III in the Canadian third-tier League1 Ontario, making his debut on August 19 against Ottawa South United. He spent the 2020 preseason with the NYCFC first-team, appearing in four matches, scoring twice, including a goal against Brazilian club Palmeiras. He departed NYCFC after 2020, and in early 2021 went on trial with Spanish clubs UD San Sebastián de los Reyes and CD Lugo.

Club career
In September 2021, after a successful trial, De Rosario signed a three-year contract with Ukrainian Premier League club Rukh Lviv, and was assigned to the reserves. He made his professional debut for Rukh in the UPL as a starter against Mynai the next month on October 24. In February 2022, he left the club by mutual consent, nine days before the 2022 Russian invasion of Ukraine after United States President Joe Biden urged all American citizens to leave Ukraine.

After leaving Ukraine, De Rosario joined Canadian Premier League club York United on trial during their pre-season in March 2022. The next month on April 6, York announced they had signed De Rosario to a one-year contract, with options for 2023 and 2024. He made his debut in York's season opener against the HFX Wanderers on April 7. In De Rosario's next match on April 15 against FC Edmonton, he started his first match, in which he scored his first goal. On August 2, he was named Player of the Week for the first time for Week 17. In September, he became the club's all-time leading scorer, when he scored his 12th goal. At the end of the season, he was nominated for the CPL U21 Player of the Year Award, which was ultimately won by Sean Rea. In November 2022, he signed a two year extension with the club.

Personal life
He is a son of former Canadian national team player Dwayne De Rosario and the brother of Adisa De Rosario. His name is of Nigerian origin and means "God chooses (for you)".

Career statistics

References

External links

 
 York United FC bio

2001 births
Living people
Soccer players from San Jose, California
Citizens of Canada through descent
Canadian soccer players
American soccer players
Canadian sportspeople of Guyanese descent
American people of Canadian descent
American people of Guyanese descent
Soccer players from Mississauga
Association football forwards
League1 Ontario players
Ukrainian Premier League players
Toronto FC players
FC Rukh Lviv players
York United FC players
Canadian expatriate soccer players
Canadian expatriate sportspeople in Ukraine
Expatriate footballers in Ukraine